The Westerly 22 is a British trailerable sailboat that was designed by Denys Rayner as a cruiser and first built in 1963.

The design was derived from the wooden West Coaster 20 and later developed into the Nomad 22 in 1967.

Production
The design was built by Westerly Marine Construction in the United Kingdom, between 1963 and 1967, with 332 boats completed.

Design
The Westerly 22 is a recreational keelboat, built predominantly of glassfibre, with wood trim. It has a Gunter rig or an optional masthead sloop rig, a spooned raked stem, an angled transom, a skeg-mounted rudder controlled by a tiller and a twin fixed keels. It displaces  and carries  of ballast.

The boat is normally fitted with a small outboard motor for docking and manoeuvring, although a Volvo Penta M1 inboard diesel was a factory option.

The design has sleeping accommodation for four people, with a double "V"-berth in the bow cabin and two straight settee berths in the main cabin. The galley is located on both sides of the cabin, amidships. The galley is equipped with a two-burner stove and grill to port and a sink to starboard. A navigation station is located on the port side above the stove. The head is located centred in the bow cabin, under the "V"-berth.

Operational history
The boat is supported by an active class club that organizes sailing events, the Westerly Owners Association.

See also
List of sailing boat types

Related development
Nomad 22

References

Keelboats
1960s sailboat type designs
Sailing yachts
Trailer sailers
Sailboat type designs by Denys Rayner
Sailboat types built by Westerly Marine Construction